The Beyeren Armorial is a manuscript roll of arms of the early 15th century, containing 1096 hand-colored coats of arms, with annotations in Middle Dutch. It is held by in the National Library of the Netherlands in The Hague (KB), shelf mark 79 K 21.

]

History
The manuscript was compiled at the court of Holland and was completed  on 23 June 1405 by Claes Heynenzoon (c.1345−1414). He was Ruwieren King of Arms, the chief herald of the Netherlands around 1400. He is also  the creator of the Gelre (Guelders) Armorial, for which he has also been referred to as the "Gelre Herald".

Contents
The manuscripts is divided into 5 series or chapters
 I (fol. 1r–8v, 18r–28v): 337 coats of arms from participants in a tournament in Compiègne, "February 1238" [mccxxxviii]: the indicated date is likely in error (as many of the coats of arms would be anachronistic), perhaps  1278 [mcclxxviii] is intended (the coat of arms of the king of Sicily is that of Anjou, for Charles I, r. 1266–1285); the Luxebourg lion for "Henry of Luxembourg" would then be in reference to Henry VI (1240–1288), father of emperor Henry VII.
 II (fol. 28v–35v, 49r–52v): 191 coats of arms from participants in a tournament in Mons; 1310
 III (fol. 52v–57v, 36r–48v, 9r–13r): 404 coats of arms from participants in a raid against the Frisians in Kuinre; 1396
 IV (fol. 13r–17v, 58r–60r): 122 coats of arms from participants in the siege of Gorinchem; 1402
 V (fol. 60r–62v): 14 series of The Three Best, by given name ("the three best Johns", "the three best Williams", etc. )

Fol. 64v has a doodle of heart symbols pierced by arrows with the maxim Wacht u, dool ich ("you wake, I sleep").

References

Beelaerts van Blokland, W.A. (1933) Beyeren quondam Gelre armorum rex de Ruyris. Eene historisch-heraldische studie, (The Hague)
Anrooij, W. van (1990) Spiegel van ridderschap. Heraut Gelre en zijn ereredes. (Amsterdam, Prometheus)
Verbij-Schillings, Jeanne (1995) Beeldvorming in Holland. Heraut Beyeren en de historiografie omstreeks 1400 (Amsterdam, Prometheus)
Verbij-Schillings, Jeanne (1999) Het Haagsche handschrift van heraut Beyeren. Hs. Den Haag, Koninklijke Bibliotheek, 131 G 37 (Hilversum, Verloren)

External links
 Digitized version of the Beyeren Armorial on the website of the KB (consulted 6 September 2016)
 Description of the Beyeren Armorial on the World Digital Library (consulted 6 September 2016)

Dutch coats of arms
Illuminated heraldic manuscripts